Maelsechlainn Ó Cellaigh, king of Uí Maine, Chief of the Name, died in 1402.

Maelsechlainn was a son of the previous king, and continued the kingdom's expansion, and rise of prestige, that William Buidhe had initiated. The borders were expanded as land lost in the 13th century to the Earl of Ulster was regained at the expense of war with the Burke of Clanricarde, At one stage, Ó Cellaigh's power extended to within a few miles of Loughrea, the caput of the Clanricarde.

Notes

Further reading

 The Tribes and customs of Hy-Many, John O'Donovan, 1843
 The Parish of Ballinasloe, Fr. Jerome A. Fahey.
 The Surnames of Ireland, Edward MacLysaght, Dublin, 1978.
 A New History of Ireland - lists and genealogies, vol. 9, Oxford University Press, 1984.
 The Story of the Concannons,  Maureen Concannon O'Brien, Clan Publications, Dublin, c.1995.
 "The Ó Ceallaigh Rulers of Uí Mhaine - A Genealogical Fragment, c. 1400 Part 1", Nollaig Ó Muraíle, Journal of the Galway Archaeological and Historical Society, vol. 60, 2008.
 
 
 Revised edition of McCarthy's synchronisms at Trinity College Dublin.

People from County Galway
People from County Roscommon
Maelsechlann
14th-century Irish monarchs
Kings of Uí Maine